Roy Purdy is an American rapper, dancer, YouTuber, and skateboarder. Purdy's first viral video was a 2016 Running Man Challenge set in his high school. He has released several singles, including Walk It out! and Oh Wow.  Purdy is known for his pink and green sunglasses and overall use of 1980s fashion. Purdy's YouTube channel had 3.16 million subscribers as of November 2021.

Career
Purdy's first viral release was a Running Man Challenge video posted on his YouTube channel in May 2016. One month afterwards, his video "when u graduated af" went viral, featuring Purdy dabbing during his high school graduation ceremony.

Since his debut, Purdy has released a number of music videos through his YouTube channel and other platforms, including SoundCloud and Spotify. His style has been described as "smooth" and "Asher Roth-like."

Purdy toured with Yung Gravy in April 2018 and was later signed by CAA.

Discography

Singles

References

Living people
1998 births
Hip hop singers
Dancers from Wisconsin
Music YouTubers